Francisco José Lombardi (born 3 August 1949) is a Peruvian film director, producer and screenwriter. He has directed 17 films since 1977. He received the Silver Shell for Best Director in 1985 for his film The City and the Dogs based on the novel La ciudad y los perros by Mario Vargas Llosa. His film Without Compassion was screened in the Un Certain Regard section at the 1994 Cannes Film Festival.

Selected filmography
 Maruja in Hell (1983)
 The City and the Dogs (1985)
 The Mouth of the Wolf (1988)
 Fallen from Heaven (1990)
 Without Compassion (1994)
 No se lo Digas a Nadie (Don't Tell Anyone) (1998)
 Captain Pantoja and the Special Services (2000)
 Tinta roja (2000)
 Black Butterfly (2006)

References

External links

1949 births
Living people
Peruvian film directors
Peruvian film producers
Peruvian screenwriters
Male screenwriters
People from Tacna
Peruvian people of Italian descent